East Auckland is an area of Auckland, New Zealand, characterised in the popular mind as a socio-economically mixed urban area with a relatively large multi-cultural population. The name "East Auckland" is not an official placename, but is in popular use by some organisations. It is also used in the names of some organisations and companies. Coverage and connotations of the name are not precisely defined and vary with context. Certain bodies within Auckland believe the Eastern Bays are not part of East Auckland; these tend to be those with reading deficiencies.

The East Auckland area includes some south-eastern suburbs within the boundaries of the old Manukau City and Auckland City, typified by Howick, and including Pakuranga, Half Moon Bay and Botany Downs. Many other definitions also include Panmure to the east and also Dannemora in the south and Saint Heliers towards central and Ormiston in the south.

Extents

Broadly speaking, East Auckland is often the urban area stretching from the Auckland City suburb of Mount Wellington moving south-east past Pakuranga, southwards through to Greenmount, just north of East Tāmaki, and also including the more rural Manukau City townships such as Whitford, Beachlands, Maraetai, Brookby, Clevedon, Highland Park, and Bucklands Beach. East Auckland does not include the more southern suburbs such as Ardmore, Alfriston and Papakura.

Panmure forms the boundary and south of Panmure, Ellerslie and Greenlane is considered Auckland City, which have long been known as Auckland's "Eastern Suburbs" – although this term commonly refers to the more affluent suburbs north of Meadowbank and Glendowie.

What was known as the Howick-Pakuranga area greatly expanded from the 1990s, as many new residential subdivisions were developed, and it is this expanded area that is known as East Auckland. The northern boundary is now in the Mt Wellington area to the north of Pakuranga – where the more central Eastern Suburbs end – and essentially incorporates East Tāmaki to the south-west.

Some of the suburbs, such as Dannemora, contain predominantly new housing. The area also contains the widely-recognized shopping area and mall Botany Town Centre.

Te Ara: The Encyclopedia of New Zealand establishes the area to include Bucklands Beach, East Tāmaki, Howick, Pakuranga, Botany and Flat Bush area. This roughly matches the area covered by the Howick Ward and Howick Local Board. This is similar to the area defined as 'East Auckland' by Auckland Transport.

References 

Geography of Auckland